Liz DiFiore is a New Zealand film and television producer, best known for her work on New Zealand drama productions, including features and short films. She has worked on over 50 local and international productions spanning genres such as drama, reality TV, documentary, and comedy.

Born in New York, to New Zealand parents, in recent years, DiFiore worked as Unit Production Manager on several feature films including Anacondas: Hunt for the Blood Orchid. She also worked on the multi-Emmy nominated Ike: Countdown to D-Day, and in Murder In Greenwich, Lucy, and Blood Crime.

Early life
Her parents were New Zealand scientists so she travelled extensively in her early years, while developing an interest in film - making her first film when she was 17. After producing several short films including Playing Possum with director Peter Salmon, she started Godzone Pictures to celebrate the short film genre. DiFiore wanted to develop and foster new talent in the New Zealand short film world while creating a pool of directors who could venture into feature films with her. In 2001, Godzone Pictures was selected to executive produce the short films for the New Zealand Film Commission with Peter Salmon. Out of these films Peter Salmon and Liz DiFiore executive produced Closer which was selected for Cannes with director David Rittey, From Where I'm Standing, The Freezer - directed by Paolo Rotondo, Picnic Stops which was selected for Hof International Film Festival - directed by Kirstin Marcon and Kerosene Creek which was selected for the Buster's Children's Film Festival and the Prague Short Film Festival - directed by Michael Bennett.

Godzone Pictures
DiFiore owns Godzone Pictures, a production company based in Avondale, New Zealand. The production company was established in 2000 and has been active in the New Zealand film and television industry for over 10 years. They offer full production services.

Other projects
DiFiore attended the Moscow International Film Market representing the film Russian Snark. She is also working with Making Movies on their project Ice Captain.

Awards and festivals

Short films
Playing Possum: Special Jury Mention Antalya Film Festival, Telluride, Screening SciFi Channel – USA Network, Cannes Cinephiles 2002, Grand Prize & Audience Prize L’Etrange Film Festival Paris 2000, Tribeca Film Festival.
Letters about the Weather: Special Jury Mention Claremont Ferrand, Telluride, Cannes Cinephiles 2001, many international festivals, Sci-Fi Channel. NZ Film Award – Best Actor in a short film – Sara Wiseman and nominated for best script.
Watermark: In competition Rotterdam 2002, Cannes Cinephiles 2002, Festival de Paris, Edinburgh, Lucarno, São Paulo, Hof, St Tropez. Best Picture, Actress & DOP – Drifting Clouds Film Festival.
Ride: Oceania programme – Montreal 2004, Brisbane 2004, LA Shorts Fest 2004, Clermont Ferrand 2004, St. Tropez Film Festival, Sale to Italy, Ireland, Latin America, Asia, Canada and Spain TV, Hof 2004, Richmond Rd Film Festival, Drifting Clouds Film Festival.

References

External links
 Godzone Pictures
 Russian Snark Official Site
 
 Liz DiFiore at EICAR International

Living people
New Zealand film producers
Year of birth missing (living people)
New Zealand women film producers